Henry Michael Hyams (March 4, 1806 – June 25, 1875) was an American lawyer, planter and Democratic politician. He served as the 7th Lieutenant Governor of Louisiana from 1862 to 1864 under Governor Thomas Overton Moore during the American Civil War, when Louisiana joined the Confederate States of America. He was an advocate of slavery in the United States.

Early life
Henry M. Hyams was born on March 4, 1806, in Charleston, South Carolina. His cousin was Judah P. Benjamin (1811–1884).

Career
Hyams worked for the Canal Bank in Donaldsonville, Louisiana. He was admitted to the Louisiana bar in 1830, and he joined the law firm Dunbar and Elgee in Alexandria, Louisiana, becoming one of the first Jews living in Alexandria. He also operated a plantation.

Hyams moved to New Orleans, Louisiana, in 1853, where he practised the law. He then served as a clerk of the District Court of Natchitoches Parish, Louisiana. He was elected to the Louisiana State Senate as a Democrat in 1855. He then served as the  Lieutenant Governor of Louisiana from 1862 to 1864.

Hyams supported slavery. Indeed, as early as the 1830s, he joined a vigilante group to defend the institution of slavery.

Personal life and death
Hyams was an observant Jew. He married Laurel Matilda Smith and had thirteen children. His son, Henry M. Hyams, Jr. (1846-1887), became a lawyer and practiced law in New Orleans.

Hyams died on June 25, 1875, in New Orleans, Louisiana. His funeral was held by Rabbi James Koppel Gutheim, and he was buried in Lafayette Cemetery in New Orleans. His obituary in The Times-Picayune described him as "a standard-bearer of the ancient regime."

References

1806 births
1875 deaths
American planters
American proslavery activists
American vigilantes
Jewish American state legislators in Louisiana
Jewish Confederates
Lawyers from New Orleans
Democratic Party Louisiana state senators
Politicians from Alexandria, Virginia
Politicians from Charleston, South Carolina
Politicians from New Orleans
19th-century American politicians
Lawyers from Charleston, South Carolina
Lawyers from Alexandria, Virginia
American white supremacists
19th-century American lawyers